Percival's sister is a role of two similar but distinct characters in the Holy Grail stories within the Arthurian legend featuring the Grail hero Percival (Perceval). The first of them is named Dindrane, the second is usually unnamed and is known today as the Grail heroine.

Dindrane
Dindrane (or Dandrane, Danbrann, Dandrenor, Dindraine, etc.) is a character in the Old French romance Perlesvaus, or The High Book of the Holy Grail, an anonymous prose altered adaptation of (and a sequel to) Chrétien de Troyes' unfinished poem Perceval, the Story of the Grail. A sister of King Arthur's knight Percival, who rescues her from an evil bride kidnapper, Dindrane lives out her days as a maiden in the Grail Castle, together with her brother (Percival) and mother. The latter is Yglais, herself a sister of King Pelles and widow of Alain "the Large", lord of the valley and castle of Kamaalot (Camelot).

The pre-cyclic version of the Prose Lancelot names her Heliabel, describing her as even more beautiful than Guinevere. Heliabel later evolved into the character of Galahad's mother.

Grail heroine

Contrary to popular notion, Dindrane in the 13th-century Perlesvaus is not the sister of Percival who dies helping him (with Galahad and Bors) achieve the Holy Grail. This distinct latter character appears, unnamed, in the Vulgate Queste del Saint Graal (Quest for the Holy Grail) and its successors—and in the same context as Agresizia in the 14th-century Italian Tavola Ritonda.

Though frequently left unnamed, Perceval's sister is a prominent figure in many of the Grail romances, sometimes dubbed the "Grail heroine". According to Anna Caughey, Thomas Malory's portrayal of Percival's sister in his 15th-century Le Morte d'Arthur characterizes her with an unusual "seizure of power and agency for a Malorian [good] woman that has previously been seen only in ambivalent or actively evil figures such as Nynyve or Morgan le Fay."

She is first encountered upon her brother (sometimes half-brother)'s return to their mother's castle, where she tells him that their mother has died. Percival leaves her either in the care of their hermit uncle or (in other texts) at the Castle of Maidens. She later meets up with Percival, Galahad and Bors, telling them who she is (she does not mention her name prior to this). She proceeds to inform them of the Sword of the Strange Belt, the magical Ship of Solomon, the Tree of Life, and other aspects of her destiny. The travellers board the Ship of Solomon, intent to complete the mystical Grail quest. After leaving the ship, they encounter a castle with a leprous mistress; told that only the blood of a maiden princess can cure the chatelaine's leprosy, Percival's sister opts to donate hers, but succumbs to the blood loss and dies. As per her dying wish, the damsel's body is set adrift in a boat (without a crew) to float to the holy city of Sarras. In some versions, Lancelot (Galahad's father) finds her vessel and buries her in Palais Esperitel; in others, she is interred by Galahad and Bors when they land at the port of Sarras, after which they proceed to win the Grail.

See also
 Elaine of Corbenic

References
Footnotes

Citations

External links
Perceval's Sister at The Camelot Project

Arthurian characters
Holy Grail